Tishkin may refer to:

Dmitri Tishkin, Russian Olympic swimmer
Maksim Tishkin (b. 1981), Russian footballer
Tishkin, alternate name of Tashkan-e Sadat, a village in Iran